Ashar District is a district (bakhsh) in Mehrestan County, Sistan and Baluchestan province, Iran. In 2006, its population was 12,070, in 2,355 families.  The district has no cities. The district has two rural districts (dehestan): Ashar Rural District and Irafshan Rural District.

References 

Mehrestan County
Districts of Sistan and Baluchestan Province